A World Still Turning is a 2003 studio album by Ian Shaw.

Critical reception

The Penguin Guide to Jazz Recordings awarded the album a maximum four-star rating, describing it as “engaged, passionate and musically rewarding”.

Track listing
"Alone Again (Naturally)" (Gilbert O'Sullivan) – 4:13
"We All Fall in Love Sometimes" (Elton John, Bernie Taupin) – 4:21
"An Occasional Dream" (David Bowie) – 4:03
"Peace" (Kitarō, Horace Silver) – 4:28
"Soon As the Weather Breaks" (Bobby Bland, Margie Evans, Pea Vee) – 3:24
"This Is Always" (Mack Gordon, Harry Warren) – 6:49
"Rockabye" (Ian Shaw) – 6:43
"Don't Ask Why" (Alan Broadbent, Chris Hobler, Mark Murphy) – 6:04
"Speak Low" (Ogden Nash, Kurt Weill) – 5:55
"Gotta Serve Somebody" (Bob Dylan) – 3:47
"I'm Glad There Is You" (Jimmy Dorsey, Paul Mertz) – 3:18
"Guilty" (Randy Newman) – 6:09
"The Tourist" (Radiohead) – 6:18

Personnel
Ian Shaw – vocals, piano, arranger
Mark Murphy – vocals
Mark Fletcher – drums
Peter Washington – double bass
Paul Bollenback – guitar
Billy Childs – piano
Eric Alexander – tenor saxophone
Alan Broadbent – arranger
Jeff Gascoyne
James Pearson
Nick Weldon
Production
Laura Marzec – art direction
Peter Doris – assistant engineer
Derek Kwan – associate producer
Katherine Miller – engineer
Darren Crowdy – executive producer
Harvey Rosen
Alan Silverman – mastering
Roy Hendrickson – mixing
John Abbott – photography
Todd Barkan – producer

References

2003 albums
Ian Shaw (singer) albums